Dipnorhynchidae is an extinct family of prehistoric lungfishes which lived during the Devonian period.

Phylogeny
 Sarcopterygii (Class)
 Dipnoi (Subclass)
 Dipnorhynchidae (Family)
 Dipnorhynchus (Genus)
 Ganorhynchus (Genus)
 "Speonesydrion" (Genus)

References 

Prehistoric lobe-finned fish families
Prehistoric lungfish
Devonian bony fish
Devonian first appearances
Devonian extinctions